Coloman,  ( (also Slovak, Czech, Croatian),)

The Germanic origin name Coloman used by Germans since the 9th century.

 Coloman, King of Hungary
 Coloman of Galicia-Lodomeria (1208–1241)
 Coloman, Bishop of Győr (1317–1375)
 Saint Coloman of Stockerau (Koloman, Colman, Colomannus) (died 1012)
 Colomán Trabado Pérez (born 1958 in Vega de Valcarce)
 Coloman Braun-Bogdan (1905–1983), a Romanian football midfielder and football manager

See also 
 Kálmán

Romanian masculine given names
English masculine given names